Weiyang may refer to:

Weiyang District, Xi'an, Shaanxi, China
Weiyang District, Yangzhou, former district in Jiangsu, China
Weiyang Palace, ancient Chinese palace near the city of Chang'an, currently known as Xi'an
Weiyang school, or Guiyang school, a sect of Zen Buddhism